Osokorky is a historical neighbourhood, on the left bank of Kyiv, the capital of Ukraine. Osokorky metro station is situated in this neighborhood.

External links

 Осокорки in Wiki-Encyclopedia Kyiv  

Neighborhoods in Kyiv